Since Brazil's first international association football match in 1914, there have been 52 occasions when a Brazilian player has scored three or more goals (a hat-trick) in a game. The first hat-trick was scored by Arthur Friedenreich against Chile in 1919. The record for the most goals scored in an international by a Brazilian player is five, which has been achieved only by Evaristo de Macedo against Colombia in 1957.

Pelé holds the record for the most hat-tricks scored by a Brazilian player, with seven between 1958 and 1964., one of them in the World Cup finals. Besides Pelé, the only Brazilian players to have scored a hat-trick at the World Cup finals were Leônidas da Silva against Poland in 1938 and Ademir de Menezes against Sweden in 1950. The last Brazilian player to score a hat-trick was Neymar, who scored three times against Peru in a World Cup qualifier in 13 October 2020.

Brazil have conceded at least 11 hat-tricks in their history, 5 of them in matches against Argentina. the most recent, and undoubtedly the most famous, was scored by Paolo Rossi during the 1982 World Cup, which eliminated Brazil in that competition.

Hat-tricks for Brazil

Most Hat-tricks for Brazil

Hat-tricks conceded by Brazil

References

hat-tricks
Brazil
Association football player non-biographical articles